Kicin  is a village in the administrative district of Gmina Czerwonak, within Poznań County, Greater Poland Voivodeship, in west-central Poland. The village has a population of 1,600.

Kicin's church is on the Wooden Churches Trail around the Puszcza Zielonka Landscape Park.

References

Kicin